The 1901 Massachusetts gubernatorial election was held on November 5, 1901. Incumbent Republican Governor W. Murray Crane was re-elected to a third term in office.

General election

Results

See also
 1901 Massachusetts legislature

References

Bibliography

Governor
1901
Massachusetts
November 1901 events